Zanthoxylum armatum, also called winged prickly ash or rattan pepper in English, is a species of plant in the family Rutaceae. It is one of the sources of the spice Sichuan pepper, and also used in folk medicine, essential oil production and as an ornamental garden plant.

Description
It is deciduous, with subsessile, opposite leaves of lanceolate, obovate or elliptic shape. Branchlets and leaves have prickles/spines. The young branchlets and inflorescence rachises are glabrous or the young branches are sparsely pubescent. The rachis of the leaves is pubescent glabrous or rust-colored and has wings to 6 mm on each side, hence it common English name, this is one of the anatomical features distinguishing it from other Zanthoxylum species. Other anatomically separating features are generally faint secondary veins of leaflet blades, especially adaxially, with 7-15 on each side of midvein; the anthers of the male flowers are yellow before anthesis; and the gynoecium of the female flowers is 1-3-carpelled. Fruit follicles are purplish-red, about 4-5mm in diameter, while the seeds are black and 3-4mm in size. The shrub flowers in China from April to May, and fruits from August to October, in Nepal it flowers during the same months, while the fruit is available all year round. In India, flowering is from March to April.

Taxonomy
The species was described by the eminent Swiss botanist Augustin Pyramus de Candolle in 1824.

The plant has an accepted infraspecific, Zanthoxylum armatum var. ferrugineum (Rehder & E.H.Wilson) C.C.Huang. This variety has rust-coloured pubescent young branchlets and inflorescence rachises distinguishing it from the nominative variety.

Distribution
The small tree is native to parts of East and Southeast Asia, and the north of the Indian sub-continent and naturalised in several regions. Regions where it occurs are: Japan; Nansei-shoto/Ryukyu Islands; Korea; North-Central, South-Central & Southeast China, specifically Anhui, Fujian, South Gansu, Guangdong, Guangxi, Guizhou, South Henan, Hubei, Hunan, Jiangsu, Jiangxi, Shaanxi, Shandong, South Shanxi, Sichuan,  Xizang, Yunnan, and Zhejiang; northern Taiwan; Philippines; Vietnam; Laos; Thailand; Myanmar; Bangladesh; India, including Assam; Bhutan; Nepal; Tibet; the Eastern and Western Himalayas; Kashmir; and Pakistan, and possibly Indonesia. It has been naturalised in Northeast Argentina and the North Caucasus.

The variety ferrugineum occurs in North-Central, South-Central & Southeast China, specifically in Guangdong, Guangxi, Guizhou, Hunan, Shaanxi, Sichuan and Yunnan.

Habitat & Ecology
Z. armatum grows in many habitats below 3100m. In the Salyan District, Nepal, the shrub grows in the understorey of lower altitude Pinus roxburghii forests, alongside Aesculus indica and Bassia latifolia, and in higher altitude oak forests (Quercus incana & Q. lanuginosa), where they associate with Rhododendron arboreum & Lyonia ovalifolia. Birds like the fruits and widely disseminate the plants.

Vernacular Names
Z. armatum is known by a number of vernacular names. In China, the plant and its fresh berries are known as téngjiāo, while the dried seeds are known as qinghuajiao or majiao.  Other names include: Qanadlı zantoksilum (Azerbaijani); Dambara in Pashto, तेजफल tejphal, darmar, tumru, timroo, trimal (Hindi);
ꯃꯨꯛꯊ꯭ꯔꯨꯕꯤ মুক্থ্ৰূবী mukthrubi (Manipuri) ;
तिमुर timur (Tamil) ;
konda-kasimi (Telugu) ;
ಜಿಮ್ಮೀ jimmi (Kannada) ;
തൂമ്പണലരി (Malayalam);
hokum (Adi);
ganya (Angami) ;
winged prickly ash, prickly ash, toothache tree, yellow wood, suterberry (English) ;
tumbru, tejbal (other names in India) ;
arhrikreh (Mizo) ;
टिमुर timur (Nepali);
หมักก้าก, hui-jiao (Thai) ;
Sẻn gai (Vietnamese); 竹叶花椒, 毛竹叶花椒, zhu ye hua jiao (Standard Chinese) ;
flügelstachelige Stachelesche (German). and 

The variety ferrugineum has the name 毛竹叶花椒 mao zhu ye hua jiao in Standard Chinese.

Uses

The fruit and seeds of the plant are used as a spice, Sichuan pepper while the bark, fruit and seeds are used in indigenous medicines in India, Nepal and Thailand. The plant is also a source of an essential oil, Wartara Oil, and the shrub is also grown as an ornamental garden plant.

In the Silyan district of Nepal, the parts used in medicine are harvested primarily of export to India. The plants grow in state-controlled, community-controlled and private lands, resulting in a variety of access regimes, harvesting regimes and management practices, leading to a conclusion that in general the effects of supply and demand on Non-timber forest products (NTFP) cannot be generalised, but are specific to each product and place.

Extracts have been shown to inhibit the growth of  Porphyromonas gingivalis – the main bacteria involved in Periodontal disease and suspected cause of Alzheimer's disease.

Literature
Additional information is contained in the following:
Arana, M.D. & Oggero, A.J. (2009). Zanthoxylum armatum (Rutaceae), su presencia en Argentina Darwiniana 47: 335-338.
Balkrishna, A. (2018). Flora of Morni Hills (Research & Possibilities): 1-581. Divya Yoga Mandir Trust.
Barooah, C. & Ahmed, I. (2014). Plant diversity of Assam. A checklist of Angiosperms and Gymnosperms: 1-599. Assam science technology and environment council, India.
Chang, C.S., Kim, H. & Chang, K.S. (2014). Provisional checklist of vascular plants for the Korea peninsula flora (KPF): 1-660. DESIGNPOST.
Chowdhery, H. J. & B. M. Wadhwa. 1984. Flora of Himachal Pradesh.
Council of Scientific and Industrial Research, India. 1976. The wealth of India: a dictionary of Indian raw materials and industrial products. Raw materials. 11:18-21.
Duke, J. A. et al. 2002. CRC Handbook of medicinal herbs
Editorial Committee of the Flora of Taiwan. 1993-. Flora of Taiwan, ed. 2.
Encke, F. et al. 1993. Zander: Handwörterbuch der Pflanzennamen, 14. Auflage
Facciola, S. 1990. Cornucopia, a source book of edible plants Kampong Publications.
Grierson, A.J.C. & Long, D.G. (2001). Flora of Bhutan 2: 1-1675. Royal Botanic Gardens, Edinburgh.
Hara, H. et al. 1978-1982. An enumeration of the flowering plants of Nepal.
Hartley, T. G. 1966. A revision of the Malesian species of Zanthoxylum (Rutaceae). J. Arnold Arbor. 47:211.
Huxley, A., ed. 1992. The new Royal Horticultural Society dictionary of gardening
Iwatsuki, K., Boufford, D.E. & Ohba, H. (eds.) (1999). Flora of Japan IIc: 1-328. Kodansha Ltd., Tokyo.
Kala, C. P. et al. 2004. Prioritization of medicinal plants on the basis of available knowledge, existing practices and use value status in Uttaranchal, India. Biodivers. & Conservation 13:459. URL: http://www.springer.com/life+sciences/evolutionary+%26+developmental+biology/journal/10531
Kress, W.J., DeFilipps, R.A., Farr, E. & Kyi, D.Y.Y. (2003). A Checklist of the Trees, Shrubs, Herbs and Climbers of Myanmar Contributions from the United States National Herbarium 45: 1-590. Smithsonian Institution.
Lê, T.C. (2005). Danh lục các loài thục vật Việt Nam [Checklist of Plant Species of Vietnam] 3: 1-1248. Hà Noi : Nhà xu?t b?n Nông nghi?p.
McGuffin, M., J. T. Kartesz, A. Y. Leung, & A. O. Tucker. 2000. Herbs of commerce, ed. 2 American Herbal Products Association, Silver Spring, Maryland.
Nasir, E. & Ali, S.I. (eds.) (1970-1995). Flora of West Pakistan 1-131.
Nobis, M. & al. (2019). Contribution to the flora of Asian and European countries: new national and regional vascular plant records, 8 Botany Letters 166: 153-188.
Sharma, B. D. et al., eds. 1993-. Flora of India.
Walters, S. M. et al., eds. 1986-2000. European garden flora.
Wu, Z. & Raven, P.H. (eds.) (2008). Flora of China 11: 1-622. Science Press (Beijing) & Missouri Botanical Garden Press (St. Louis).

References

 Plants for a Future entry
 Uni-Ulm entry

armatum
Flora of China
Flora of Eastern Asia
Flora of tropical Asia
Medicinal plants of Asia
Peppers
Plants described in 1824
Spices